The Milky Milky Milk Tour (initially called the Miley Cyrus & Her Dead Petz Tour) was the fifth concert tour by American singer Miley Cyrus, held in support of her fifth studio album, Miley Cyrus & Her Dead Petz (2015). The limited-run tour visited eight cities across North America. She was joined by the Flaming Lips and Dan Deacon throughout the tour.

Background and development 
Cyrus announced the tour on October 3, 2015 through her Instagram account after her appearance on Saturday Night Live, adding tickets for the tour would be on sale on October 7, 2015. Live Nation promoted the tour. On November 4, 2015, Cyrus announced two additional tour dates in Vancouver, British Columbia, Canada and Los Angeles. She also announced the tour had been renamed the Milky Milky Milk Tour.

One of the outfits Cyrus wore on the tour was an S&M/bondage style top that included fake breasts (to give the illusion of toplessness), and a giant prosthetic penis. Cyrus wore this outfit while performing "Karen Don't Be Sad". Costume designed and created by artist Colin Christian.

On December 19, 2015, go90 live streamed Cyrus' December 19 show in Los Angeles, the farewell night of the tour. The stream ran for a length of 130 minutes, recording the entire show.

Set list
This set list is representative of the concert on November 28, 2015. It does not represent all concerts for the duration of the tour.

"Dooo It!"
"Love Money Party"
"1 Sun"
"The Floyd Song (Sunrise)"
"Something About Space Dude"
"Space Bootz"
"BB Talk"
"Fweaky"
"Bang Me Box"
"Lighter"
"Slab of Butter"
"I Forgive Yiew"
"Milky Milky Milk"
"Miley Tibetan Bowlzzz"
"Tiger Dreams"
"Pablow the Blowfish"
"Twinkle Song"
Encore
 "Karen Don't Be Sad"
"Evil Is But a Shadow"
"We Can't Stop"

Tour dates

References 

2015 concert tours
Miley Cyrus concert tours